A catchword is a word placed at the foot of a handwritten or printed page that is meant to be bound along with other pages in a book. The word anticipates the first word of the following page. It was meant to help the bookbinder or printer make sure that the leaves were bound in the right order or that the pages were set up in the press in the right order. Catchwords appear in some medieval manuscripts, and appear again in printed books late in the fifteenth century. The practice became widespread in the mid sixteenth century, and prevailed until the arrival of industrial printing techniques late in the eighteenth century.

Theodore Low Devinne's 1901 guide on Correct Composition had this to say:

For more than three centuries printers of books appended at the foot of every page the first word or syllable of the next page. This catchword was supposed to be needed by the reader to make clear the connection between the two pages; but the catchword is now out of use, and it is not missed.

See also 
 Reclamans

Notes

References 

 De Hamel, Christopher. Scribes and Illuminators. Toronto: University of Toronto Press, 1992. 41.
 Gaskell, Philip. A New Introduction to Bibliography. Oxford: Clarendon Press, 1972. 52–53.
 McKerrow, Ronald B. An Introduction to Bibliography for Literary Students. Oxford: Clarendon Press, 1964. 82.
 Roberts, Matt T., and Don Etherington, Bookbinding and the Conservation of books: A Dictionary of Descriptive Terminology

Printing terminology
Bookbinding
Book terminology